The 2009 1000 km of Spa was the second round of the 2009 Le Mans Series season. It took place at the Circuit de Spa-Francorchamps, Belgium, on 10 May 2009. Several teams used Spa as a test prior to the 24 Hours of Le Mans, including eventual winners Team Peugeot and Team Essex Porsche, as well as the Jetalliance Racing Aston Martin.

Report

Qualifying
The qualifying sessions for both the GT and Prototype categories were marked by several red flag periods which halted the sessions. These were caused by several accidents and car failures on circuit, which left five cars unable to complete a flying lap time. Peugeot was able to lock out the first row by margin of over a second from the leading Aston Martin, while the returning Team Essex Porsche RS Spyder secured pole position in LMP2. Jetalliance Racing gave Aston Martin a pole in GT1 and championship leaders Team Felbermayr-Proton led GT2.

Qualifying result
Pole position winners in each class are marked in bold.

Race

Race results
Class winners in bold. Cars failing to complete 70% of winner's distance marked as Not Classified (NC).

References

External links
 Le Mans Series - 1000 km of Spa

Spa
6 Hours of Spa-Francorchamps
2009 in Belgian motorsport